Mollemeta is a monotypic genus of long-jawed orb-weavers endemic to Chile. It contains the single species, Mollemeta edwardsi, first described as Landana edwardsi, based on a female found in 1904. The name is a reference to "Molle", the Mapudungun word for "tree", because it builds its vertical orb webs on tree trunks. It is in a clade with Allende, Chrysometa, Dolichognatha, Meta, and Metellina due to several autapomorphies, including the unique shapes of the cymbium, conductor, and embolus.

See also
 List of Tetragnathidae species
 Allende
 Chrysometa
 Dolichognatha
 Meta
 Metellina

References

Monotypic Araneomorphae genera
Spiders of South America
Tetragnathidae
Endemic fauna of Chile